The Women's Sprint event at the 2010 South American Games was held at 9:00 on March 24.

Individual

Medalists

Results

Team

Medalists

Results

References
Report

Women's sprint